Luis Fernando Cruzado Sánchez (6 July 1941 – 14 February 2013) was a Peruvian footballer who played as a midfielder for Peru in the 1970 FIFA World Cup.

Club career
Cruzado started his career in 1959 with Universitario de Deportes and played his final season with Juan Aurich.

Managerial career
Cruzado managed the Peru women's national football team at the 2003 South American Championship.

Death
He died in Hospital 14 February 2013  in Lima, Peru. He was survived by his 3 children. He was widower of Margarita Navarrete, mother of his son and two daughters.

References

External links

FIFA profile

1941 births
2013 deaths
Footballers from Lima
Peruvian footballers
Association football midfielders
Club Universitario de Deportes footballers
Juan Aurich footballers
Peru international footballers
1970 FIFA World Cup players
Peruvian football managers
Women's association football managers
Peru women's national football team managers